Inquisitor aemula is a species of sea snail, a marine gastropod mollusk in the family Pseudomelatomidae, the turrids and allies.

Description

Distribution
This marine species occurs off New South Wales, Australia

References

External links
 
 Proceedings of the Royal Society of Victoria. New series. v. 43 (1930-1931)
 Macpherson, J Hope - Chapple, E H, A systematic list of the marine and estuarine Mollusca of Victoria; Memoirs of the National Museum of Victoria no. 17 (1951)

aemula
Gastropods described in 1877
Gastropods of Australia